Live 1999 may refer to:

Burning Japan Live 1999 live album by the Swedish melodic death metal band Arch Enemy

See also
 Live (Lara Fabian album)